A space gun, sometimes called a Verne gun because of its appearance in From the Earth to the Moon by Jules Verne, is a method of launching an object into space using a large gun- or cannon-like structure. Space guns could thus potentially provide a method of non-rocket spacelaunch. However, these speeds are too far into the hypersonic range for most practical propulsion systems and also would cause most objects to burn up due to aerodynamic heating or be torn apart by aerodynamic drag. 
Therefore, a more likely future use of space guns would be to launch objects into Low Earth orbit, at which point attached rockets could be fired or the objects could be "collected" by maneuverable orbiting satellites.

However, a space gun has never been successfully used to launch an object into orbit or out of Earth's gravitational pull.

Technical issues 
The large g-force likely to be experienced by a ballistic projectile launched in this manner would mean that a space gun would be incapable of safely launching humans or delicate instruments, rather being restricted to freight, fuel or ruggedized satellites.

Getting to orbit
A space gun by itself is not capable of placing objects into a stable orbit around the object (planet or otherwise) they are launched from.   The orbit is a parabolic orbit, a hyperbolic orbit, or part of an elliptic orbit which ends at the planet's surface at the point of launch or another point.  This means that an uncorrected ballistic payload will always strike the planet within its first orbit unless the velocity was so high as to reach or exceed escape velocity. As a result, all payloads intended to reach a closed orbit need at least to perform some sort of course correction to create another orbit that does not intersect the planet's surface.

A rocket can be used for additional boost, as planned in both Project HARP and the Quicklaunch project.

In a three-body or larger system, a gravity assist trajectory might be available such that a carefully aimed escape velocity projectile would have its trajectory modified by the gravitational fields of other bodies in the system such that the projectile would eventually return to orbit the initial planet using only the launch delta-v.

Isaac Newton avoided this objection in his thought experiment by placing his notional cannon atop a tall mountain and positing negligible air resistance. If in a stable orbit, the projectile would circle the planet and return to the altitude of launch after one orbit (see Newton's cannonball).

Acceleration 
For a space gun with a gun barrel of length, and the needed velocity, the acceleration is provided by the following formula:

Practical attempts

V3 Cannon (1944-45)
The German V-3 cannon program, during World War II was an attempt to build something approaching a space gun. Based in the Pas-de-Calais area of France it was planned to be more devastating than the other Nazi 'Vengeance weapons'. It was destroyed by RAF bombing using Tallboy blockbuster bombs in July 1944.

Super High Altitude Research Project (1985-95)
The US Ballistic Missile Defense program sponsored the Super High Altitude Research Project (SHARP) in the 1980s. Developed at Lawrence Livermore Laboratory, it is a light-gas gun and has been used to test fire objects at Mach 9.

Project Babylon (1988-90)
The most prominent recent attempt to make a space gun was artillery engineer Gerald Bull's Project Babylon, which was also known as the 'Iraqi supergun' by the media. During Project Babylon, Bull used his experience from Project HARP to build a massive cannon for Saddam Hussein, leader of Ba'athist Iraq. Bull was assassinated before the project was completed.

Quicklaunch (1996-2016)
After cancellation of SHARP, lead developer John Hunter founded the Jules Verne Launcher Company in 1996 and the Quicklaunch company.  As of September 2012, Quicklaunch was seeking to raise $500 million to build a gun that could refuel a propellant depot or send bulk materials into space.

Ram accelerators have also been proposed as an alternative to light-gas guns. Other proposals use electromagnetic techniques for accelerating the payload, such as coilguns and railguns.

In fiction

The first publication of the concept may be Newton's cannonball in his 1728 book A Treatise of the System of the World, although it was primarily used as a thought experiment regarding gravity.

Perhaps the most famous representations of a space gun appear in Jules Verne's 1865 novel From the Earth to the Moon and his 1869 novel Around the Moon (loosely interpreted into the 1902 film Le Voyage dans la Lune), in which astronauts fly to the Moon aboard a ship launched from a cannon. Another famous example is used by the Martians to launch their invasion in H. G. Wells' 1897 book The War of the Worlds. Wells also used the concept in the climax of the 1936 film Things to Come. The device was featured in films as late as 1967, such as Jules Verne's Rocket to the Moon.

In the 1991 video game Ultima: Worlds of Adventure 2: Martian Dreams, Percival Lowell builds a space gun to send a spacecraft to Mars.

The 1992 video game Steel Empire, a shoot 'em up with steampunk aesthetics, features a space gun in its seventh level that is used by the main villain General Styron to launch himself to the Moon.

In Hannu Rajaniemi's 2012 novel The Fractal Prince, a space gun at the "Jannah-of-the-cannon", powered by a 150-kiloton nuclear bomb, is used to launch a spaceship from Earth.

The 2015 video game SOMA features a space gun used to launch satellites.

Gerald Bull's assassination and the Project Babylon gun were also the starting point for Frederick Forsyth's 1994 novel The Fist of God. In Larry Bond's 2001 novella and 2015 novel Lash-Up, China uses a space gun to destroy American GPS satellites.

In the 2004 role-playing game Paper Mario: The Thousand-Year Door, a village of Bob-ombs operates a space gun to send Paper Mario and company to the X-Naut's base on the Moon.

Gerald Bull and Project Babylon are integral to the plot of Louise Penny's 2015 novel The Nature of the Beast.

See also

 Newton's cannonball
 The Fist of God
 SHARP
 Quicklaunch
 SpinLaunch
 StarTram
 Mass driver
 Space elevator
 Launch loop
 Lightcraft
 Space fountain
 Tether propulsion
 Non-rocket spacelaunch

References

External links
 New technology testing may achieve the goals of HARP "space" gun
 FAS space gun page
 The 150 Kiloton Nuclear Verne Gun
 Green Launch

 
Megastructures
Spacecraft propulsion
Spaceflight technology
Vertical transport devices
Space access